A Woman for Life is a 1960 West German musical comedy film directed by Wolfgang Liebeneiner and starring Ruth Leuwerik, Klausjürgen Wussow, and Harry Meyen.

The film's sets were designed by Robert Herlth and Robert Stratil. It was made at the Bavaria Studios in Munich.

Partial cast

References

Bibliography

External links 
 

1960 films
1960 musical comedy films
German musical comedy films
West German films
1960s German-language films
Films directed by Wolfgang Liebeneiner
Films set in the 1910s
Films set in the 1920s
Films set in the 1940s
Bavaria Film films
Films shot at Bavaria Studios
1960s German films